In Greek mythology Philonis (Ancient Greek: Φιλωνίς) was an Attican daughter of Daedalion or of Eosphoros and Cleoboea, from Thoricus. In some accounts, King Deion of Phocus was also called the father of Philonis making her one of the Aeolids, her mother was probably Diomede, daughter of Xuthus. She was the mother of Philammon and Autolycus by Apollo and Hermes, respectively. In some accounts, the mother of Philammon was called Chione or Leuconoe.

Notes

References 

 Conon, Fifty Narrations, surviving as one-paragraph summaries in the Bibliotheca (Library) of Photius, Patriarch of Constantinople translated from the Greek by Brady Kiesling. Online version at the Topos Text Project.
 Gaius Julius Hyginus, Fabulae from The Myths of Hyginus translated and edited by Mary Grant. University of Kansas Publications in Humanistic Studies. Online version at the Topos Text Project.
 Hesiod, Catalogue of Women from Homeric Hymns, Epic Cycle, Homerica translated by Evelyn-White, H G. Loeb Classical Library Volume 57. London: William Heinemann, 1914. Online version at theio.com
 Publius Ovidius Naso, Metamorphoses translated by Brookes More (1859-1942). Boston, Cornhill Publishing Co. 1922. Online version at the Perseus Digital Library.
 Publius Ovidius Naso, Metamorphoses. Hugo Magnus. Gotha (Germany). Friedr. Andr. Perthes. 1892. Latin text available at the Perseus Digital Library.

Women of Apollo
Women of Hermes
Mortal parents of demigods in classical mythology
Women in Greek mythology
Attican characters in Greek mythology
Phocian characters in Greek mythology